The Aluminé River is a geographical feature of Neuquén Province, Argentina. It flows southward from Lake Aluminé, near the town of Aluminé, for around 170 km (105 mi), past which it becomes a tributary of the Collón Curá River (near Junín de los Andes).

See also
List of rivers of Argentina

References
 Rand McNally, The New International Atlas, 1993.
  GEOnet Names Server 

Rivers of Argentina